Pawhuskin A is a naturally occurring prenylated stilbene isolated from Dalea purpurea which acts as a competitive silent antagonist of the κ-, μ-, and δ-opioid receptors (Ke = 203 nM, 570 nM, and 2900 nM, respectively). The compound was named after Pawhuska, Oklahoma, a place near where the samples of Dalea purpurea that led to its discovery were taken from. Other isolates of the plant with affinity for opioid receptors include Pawhuskin B and Pawhuskin C, though these compounds produce comparatively weak opioid receptor displacement (4.2–11.4 μM) relative to Pawhuskin A. Dalea purpurea was used in traditional Native American medicine to treat various ailments, and pawhuskin A and related isolates may be some of the constituents of the plant which underlay this use.

See also
 Amentoflavone
 Catechin
 Hyperoside
 Salvinorin A

References

Delta-opioid receptor antagonists
Kappa-opioid receptor antagonists
Mu-opioid receptor antagonists
Stilbenoids